Jose Vicente Bagan was president of the European Association of Oral Medicine for 2010–12. He is professor of oral medicine and the chairman of the stomatology service at the University of Valencia. He is the author of 10 books.

Selected publications
 Oral Medicine and Pathology at a Glance
 Oral and Maxillofacial Diseases

References

External links 
https://www.researchgate.net/profile/Jose_Bagan2

Living people
Year of birth missing (living people)
Academic staff of the University of Valencia
University of Valencia alumni
Spanish medical writers
21st-century Spanish physicians